The 1910 Maine Black Bears football team was an American football team that represented the University of Maine during the 1910 college football season. The team compiled a 4–1–2 record. William Parker was the team captain.

Schedule

References

Maine
Maine Black Bears football seasons
Maine Black Bears football